The Swedish Embassy in Pyongyang is Sweden's diplomatic mission in North Korea, which is located in the country's capital Pyongyang. The Swedish Embassy was one of the first embassies in North Korea, opening in 1975. The ambassador since July 2021 is Andreas Bengtsson. Until 2001, Sweden was the only western country with uninterrupted diplomatic representation in the city. The Swedish embassy serves as the protecting power for the United States and as consular representation for Australia, Canada, Italy, Finland, and Iceland.

History 

The embassy was opened in 1975 and the first ambassador with the title chargé d'affaires was Erik Cornell (1975–1977). The Swedish embassy in Pyongyang is today co-located with the French, British embassy and the German embassy in the former embassy building for East Germany. On September 16, 2010, Barbro Elm handed over her letter of credence to North Korean President Kim Yong-nam. It was the only embassy from a Western country until 2001.

On 9 December 2010, the Government Offices announced that the embassy was in danger of being closed down due to the cuts to be made to the Government Offices' costs. On 26 April 2012, Karl-Olof Andersson, current Rector of the Ministry of Foreign Affairs' diplomatic program and secretary of the Ministry of Foreign Affairs' Admissions Committee, was appointed new ambassador in the autumn of 2012. On 2 October 2012, Andersson handed over his credentials to Kim Yong-nam in a ceremony that took place in the Mansudae Congress Hall.

In 2020 because of the COVID-19 pandemic, the diplomats were withdrawn temporarily. The embassy remained open and is staffed by local employees.

Heads of Mission

References 

Sweden
North Korea–Sweden relations
North Korea